Popůvky may refer to the following places in the Czech Republic:

 Popůvky (Brno-Country District)
 Popůvky (Třebíč District)